Brunei's Next Superstar is the Bruneian version of the Idol series that started in UK, similar to shows such as Pop Idol and American Idol in the franchise but it does have a few differences. This show is a contest to determine the best young singer in Brunei. This first season premiered in December 2011.

Brunei reality television series